The British Industrial Biological Research Association was a government-run research association in the UK, and is now a private company, that investigates toxicology of commercial products.

History
The organisation was formed in 1961 by the Department of Scientific and Industrial Research (DSIR). The new buildings in Surrey were to cost £56,000, and would be fully open in 1962; at the time there were 52 British research associations.

The site has been known as the BIBRA Research Laboratories. The site mainly investigated the toxicology of food products (additives) and cosmetics. Prince Philip, Duke of Edinburgh visited the site on 8 June 1969.

Private company
The private company was later known as BIBRA by the late 1980s. It has worked with the Association of the British Pharmaceutical Industry (ABPI) and MRC.

Function
The association produced the international journal Food and Chemical Toxicology and Toxicology in Vitro.

The BIBRA Laboratories have worked with the subjects of -
 Environmental toxicology
 Immunohistochemistry

Structure
Today BIBRA is situated on the A237; it was previously further west, on the B278. The former British Industrial Biological Research Association was in northern Surrey.

See also
 British Food Manufacturing Industries Research Association
 British Toxicology Society
 Committee on Toxicity
 Registration, Evaluation, Authorisation and Restriction of Chemicals (REACH)
 Society of Cosmetic Chemists

References

1961 establishments in the United Kingdom
Biological research institutes in the United Kingdom
British research associations
Environmental toxicology
Medical Research Council (United Kingdom)
Microbiology organizations
Organisations based in the London Borough of Sutton
Pharmaceutical industry in the United Kingdom
Public health in the United Kingdom
Research institutes established in 1961
Research institutes in London
Toxicology in the United Kingdom
Toxicology organizations